The crane kick is a fictionalized version of the Mae tobi geri . The move was created by Darryl Vidal for the classic film The Karate Kid (1984). The move is taught by the character Mr. Miyagi to Daniel LaRusso and eventually used in the final scene with his arch rival Johnny Lawrence. The move involves a one-legged karate stance and launches into a flying jumping kick.  The movie became synonymous with karate in the United States and helped popularize the martial art in that country. The kick is shown multiple times in the Karate Kid franchise, including the season five finale of Cobra Kai, where Daniel uses the crane kick to defeat the main antagonist of The Karate Kid Part III (1989), Terry Silver.

Usage and effectiveness
The move's effectiveness and practicality have been questioned by critics. The premise of the technique is to lure the opponent to move forward into a counterattack by appearing vulnerable. This vulnerability is created through two obvious tactical errors which an aggressive opponent would immediately take advantage of. First, standing tall with just one foot flat on the ground creates a stationary target for an opponent to strike. Second, spreading arms wide leaves the head and center of mass undefended. It is also worth noting this kick is an extreme feat of athleticism; it takes unusual leg strength and coordination for any fighter to leap off one foot (which is already bearing all their body weight) to deliver an effective strike with that same foot. Modified versions have been used effectively in Mixed Martial Arts, most notably by Lyoto Machida. Starting from a southpaw stance, Machida feinted with his left leg before leaping off his right foot to deliver an upwards right kick to the mouth of former UFC champion Randy Couture, earning a knockout victory. Commentators Mike Goldberg and Joe Rogan immediately noted similarity to the Crane kick.

In popular culture
In the videogame Street Fighter Alpha 2, the elderly character Gen uses a crane style. He uses it again when he returns in Street Fighter IV.

References

See also
Fujian White Crane
Tibetan White Crane

Karate techniques
The Karate Kid (franchise)
Fictional martial arts
Kicks